Goodbye to Romance may refer to:

 Goodbye to Romance (song), a song by Ozzy Osbourne, from the album Blizzard of Ozz
 Goodbye to Romance (album), a 2009 album by Melody Club